Sourav Chakraborty is an Indian Politician from West Bengal, India. He was the former Member of West Bengal Legislative Assembly from Alipurduar district of West Bengal state. Currently he serves as Chairman of Siliguri Jalpaiguri Development Authority.

References

 
 
 
 
 
 

University of North Bengal alumni
Year of birth missing (living people)
Living people
West Bengal MLAs 2016–2021
Trinamool Congress politicians from West Bengal
People from Alipurduar